Roscoe is a census-designated place and unincorporated community in Carbon County, Montana, United States. As of the 2010 census it had a population of 15. Roscoe depends on light tourism and features a guest ranch, the Pioneer Pottery, and the Grizzly Bar & Grill.

Situated on Montana Highway 78, Roscoe is 20 miles from Red Lodge and 13 miles from Absarokee.

Demographics

History
Roscoe was originally called Morris. Its post office was established on July 6, 1901, with Timothy F. George at its first postmaster. The post office officially changed the name from Morris to Roscoe on February 14, 1905. This was to alleviate confusion with mail going to Norris, Montana.

References

Census-designated places in Montana
Census-designated places in Carbon County, Montana
Unincorporated communities in Montana
Unincorporated communities in Carbon County, Montana